Ioana "John" Tofi (born June 1, 1984) is an American-Samoan retired basketball player. He played as center. After playing college basketball with UTEP, he played professionally in Belgium for Leuven Bears and Okapi Aalstar.

Professional career
On May 6, 2016, Tofi was named the Basketball League Belgium Division I MVP, after averaging 15.9 points and 6.9 rebounds in 27.8 minutes over the season. Tofi led Okapi Aalstar to the Finals afterwards, but there the team lost to Telenet Oostende.

References

1984 births
Living people
American expatriate basketball people in Belgium
Basketball players from San Francisco
Centers (basketball)
UTEP Miners men's basketball players
American men's basketball players